Sir Ralph Richardson (1902–1983) was an English actor who appeared on radio, film, television and stage. Described by The Guardian as "indisputably our most poetic actor", and by the director David Ayliff as "a natural actor ... [who] couldn't stop being a perfect actor", Richardson's career lasted over 50 years. He was—in the words of his biographer, Sheridan Morley—one "of the three great actor knights of the mid-twentieth century", alongside Laurence Olivier and John Gielgud.

After seeing a production of Hamlet starring Sir Frank Benson, Richardson decided to become an actor and made his stage debut, playing a gendarme in The Bishop's Candlesticks in December 1920. After touring and appearing in rep, he made his London debut in July 1926 as the stranger in Oedipus at Colonus. In 1930 he joined the Old Vic where he first met Gielgud, staying with the company until the following year. After service during the Second World War with the Royal Naval Volunteer Reserve, he returned to acting, preferring the works of the more modern authors Luigi Pirandello, Joe Orton, Harold Pinter, George Bernard Shaw and J. B. Priestley to the classic plays of Shakespeare. A radio career ran in parallel to that on the stage, and Richardson was first broadcast in The City in 1929.

Richardson's film career began in 1931 as an uncredited extra in Dreyfus; he did not take film seriously as a medium, but undertook the work for money. His career in film was described by the film historian Brian McFarlane, writing for the British Film Institute, as "prolific and random"; McFarlane considered that in Richardson's performances, "he would remind one that he had few peers and no superiors in his particular line". Richardson won many awards for his performances on stage and screen before his death, including a BAFTA award for The Sound Barrier; an Evening Standard Award for Home, which he shared with John Gielgud; and a special Laurence Olivier Award. His final film, Greystoke: The Legend of Tarzan, Lord of the Apes—for which he received further critical plaudits and award nominations—was released after his death.

Stage roles

Radio plays

Film roles

Television

Awards and honours

See also 
List of British actors
List of British Academy Award nominees and winners
List of oldest and youngest Academy Award winners and nominees – Oldest nominees for Best Actor in a Supporting Role
List of actors with Academy Award nominations

Notes and references
Notes

References

Sources

External links

 
 
 
 
 
 Ralph Richardson on Pathé News

Male actor filmographies
British filmographies